Dahegaon is a village in Vaijapur taluka in Aurangabad district in the state of Maharashtra in India. It has population of around 2,320. 200 Years old temple of lord Hanuman

Notable People
Ramkrishna Baba Patil, former member of Maharashtra Legislative Assembly and Member of Parliament, Lok Sabha

References 

Villages in Aurangabad district, Maharashtra